Hinduism is the second-largest religion in Suriname. According to ARDA, there are 129,440 Hindus in Suriname as of 2015, constituting 23.15% of the population. Suriname has the second largest percentage of Hindus in the Western Hemisphere, after Guyana (24.8%).

History

The story of Hindus in Suriname is broadly parallel to that in Guyana and Trinidad and Tobago. Indian indentured labourers were sent to colonial Dutch Guiana by special arrangement between the Dutch and British. The difference is that the Netherlands' more liberal policy toward Hinduism allowed a stronger culture to develop. Example is the almost universal reading of the Gita and Ramayana.

Demographics
According to ARDA, there are 129,440 Hindus in Suriname as of 2015, constituting 23.15% of the population.

Population by year

 
The percentage of Hindus increased initially (1900 – 1930s), fluctuated slightly between the 1930s and 1980s, and remained stable in the 20s (20%).The demographic changes in the religious population in the first half of the 20th century can be explained by migration. In the second half of the 20th century, in particular after 1970s the decline of Hindus might be explained by large migration to the Netherlands during the independence (1975) and the military regime in the 1980-1987.

Population by districts

Hindu denominations

According to the 2012 census, 18% of Surinamese are Sanatani Hindus, 3.1% are Arya Samaj, and the remaining 1.2% followed other forms of Hinduism.

ISKCON also have a presence in Suriname. The first Hare Krishna devotees to visit Suriname were devotees from Guyana way back in the early 1980s. The first Center was established about two decades ago, and now there is a vibrant preaching center in the country’s second city, New Nickerie.

Ethnicity

 
Majority of the Hindus in Suriname are East Indians, both in absolute terms and in percentage. Hinduism has a considerable following among Mixed ethnic people (3,210 people) and Javanese Surinamese (915 people). Hinduism is also practised among Chinese Surinamese (157 people), Creole (142 people), Maroon (84 people), Indigenous people (83 people) and Afro-Surinamese (59 people).

Contemporary Society

Language
In contrast to the neighbouring Guyanese Hindus who speak English, most of the Surinamese Hindus speak Sarnami Hindustani, a dialect of Bhojpuri. This is largely due to the fact that the Dutch did not force the Indo-Caribbean population to abandon their native languages, unlike in British colonies like Trinidad and Guyana, where English was imposed as a means of attempting to erase cultural and religious traditions.

Festivals
Deepavali and Holi are national holidays in Suriname.

See also
Hinduism in Trinidad and Tobago
Hinduism in Belize
Hinduism in the Netherlands
Hinduism in Guyana
Hinduism in Guadeloupe

References

External links 
 Hinduism in Suriname, Research Paper